Monique Hoogland (born 25 August 1967) is a Dutch retired badminton player from Duinwijck club. Hoogland along with Erica van den Heuvel, won the bronze in Women's doubles at the 1998 European Championships. She is also a 5-time former National champion. During her training session in 1996 for Olympic qualification at the Amersfoort in the Netherlands, she completely tore of her Achilles tendon and missed the Olympic games due to severity of injury.

Achievements

European Championships 
Women's doubles

IBF World Grand Prix
The World Badminton Grand Prix has been sanctioned by the International Badminton Federation since 1983.

Women's doubles

IBF International 
Women's singles

Women's doubles

Mixed doubles

References 

1967 births
Living people
Sportspeople from The Hague
Dutch female badminton players